Rotator may refer to

Anatomy
Anatomical terms of motion §Rotation
List of internal rotators of the human body
List of external rotators of the human body

Other uses
Antenna rotator, a device used to change the orientation, within the horizontal plane, of a directional antenna
Field rotator or Clock drive, a mechanism to move a telescope to keep the aim in exact sync with the apparent motion of the fixed stars
Kicked rotator, a prototype model for chaos and quantum chaos studies
Polarization rotator, an optical device that rotates the polarization axis of a linearly polarized light beam by an angle of choice
Faraday rotator, a polarization rotator based on the Faraday effect
Rotator (album), a 1996 album by Danish rock band Dizzy Mizz Lizzy
Rotator truck, a type of tow truck with a rotating extendible boom

See also
List of fast rotators (minor planets)
List of slow rotators (minor planets)
Rotation (disambiguation)